Raed Al Karmi (died 14 January 2002) was a Palestinian political activist and member of the Fatah’s Tanzim. He was reportedly responsible for the killing of two Tel Aviv restaurant owners in Tulkarem in 2001. Israel also accused him of being related to the death of eight other Israelis.

He was the target of missiles by Israeli forces in September 2001 and survived the attack. However, two people he was riding with were killed. Karmi was assassinated by Israel in Tulkarem on 14 January 2002 in a bombing near his home.

A street in his hometown, Tulkarem, was named after him in 2015.

References

20th-century Palestinian people
21st-century Palestinian people
2002 deaths
Assassinated Palestinian people
Fatah military commanders
People from Tulkarm
People killed by Israeli security forces
Year of birth missing